Garry Flood (born 1952) is an Australian former Motocross and motorcycle speedway rider who was eight times motocross champion of Australia and was capped by Australasia in speedway.

Motocross career
Flood won eight Australian Motocross Championships. (125cc; 1969, 1970, 1973, 250cc; 1969, 1974 500cc; 1969, 1971, 1974)

Speedway career
Flood rode in Britain for just one season in 1972, initially for Leicester Lions, joint top scoring in a match against Peterborough Panthers, but riding most of the season with Crewe Kings, for whom he averaged over eight points from 41 matches, including ten paid maximum scores. He also had rides in the top division with Swindon Robins, King's Lynn Stars, and Wolverhampton Wolves, and represented Australasia in a series against England in 1972. 1972 proved to be his only season in British speedway, Flood returning to Australia after a couple of challenge matches for Crewe in April 1973. In 1973 he rode in Australia for Victoria.

References

1952 births
Living people
Australian speedway riders
Crewe Kings riders
Leicester Lions riders
Swindon Robins riders
Wolverhampton Wolves riders
King's Lynn Stars riders